Masali Baduza (born 1996) is a South African actress. She is best known for her role as Sephy Hadley in the BBC drama Noughts + Crosses. She was named a rising star and one to watch by the Royal Television Society.

Baduza began her career mostly in theatre and appeared in the South African crime thriller Trackers, which was M-Net's top performing show for 2019. Her films include Slumber Party Massacre (2021) and The Woman King (2022).

Early life
The youngest of six children, Baduza is from East London, Eastern Cape. She is bilingual in Xhosa and English. She trained at the Los Angeles campus of the New York Film Academy, graduating with an Associate degree in 2016.

Filmography

References

External links 
 

Living people
1996 births
21st-century South African actresses
New York Film Academy alumni
People from East London, Eastern Cape
South African stage actresses
South African television actresses
Xhosa people